DVTK Jegesmedvék is a Hungarian ice hockey team that played in the OB I bajnokság and in the Erste Liga. The previously played in the Slovak Extraliga from 2018 until 2021. They play their home games at Miskolc Ice Hall, located in Miskolc.

Team name
Over time the team's name has been the following:
1978–90 – Miskolci Kinizsi
1990–94 – Miskolci HC 
1994–2015 – Miskolci Jegesmedvék JSE
2015–present – DVTK Jegesmedvék

Honours

Domestic
Erste Liga
  Winners (3): 2014–15, 2015–16, 2016–17
  Runners-up (2): 2011–12, 2017–18
  3rd place (2): 2010–11, 2012–13

Pre-season
Tatra Cup
  Winners (1): 2019

Players

Current roster

Crest

References

External links
Official website 

Ice hockey teams in Hungary
Erste Liga (ice hockey) teams